Jeffrey Roy Holland (born December 3, 1940) is an American educator and religious leader. He served as the ninth President of Brigham Young University (BYU) and is a member of the Quorum of the Twelve Apostles of the Church of Jesus Christ of Latter-day Saints (LDS Church). As a member of the Quorum of the Twelve, Holland is accepted by the church as a prophet, seer, and revelator. Currently, he is the fourth most senior apostle in the church.

Holland was born and raised in St. George, Utah. After graduating from high school, his college education began at Dixie College and he also served a mission for the LDS Church in Great Britain. After returning from his mission, he transferred to BYU and graduated with a bachelor's degree in English. He later earned a master's degree in Religious Education at BYU. Holland received a second master's degree and later a PhD in American Studies at Yale University. In 1974, Holland was appointed BYU's Dean of Religious Education, then two years later was appointed as the eleventh commissioner of the Church Educational System (CES), replacing Neal A. Maxwell. In 1980, Holland became BYU's ninth president, replacing Dallin H. Oaks.

Early life and education
Holland was born in St. George, Utah. His father, Frank D. Holland, was a convert to the LDS Church while his mother, Alice, came from a long line of Latter-day Saints. As a youth, he worked as a newspaper carrier, a grocery bagger, and a service station attendant. As a young man, Holland served in what was then known as the British Mission. His mission president was Marion D. Hanks, a general authority of the church. He and Quentin L. Cook were missionary companions.

Holland graduated from Dixie High School. He helped the Flyers capture state high school championships in football and basketball. He began his college education at Dixie College before his mission. After returning from his mission, he served as co-captain of the Dixie basketball team. In 2011, the school broke ground for the Jeffrey R. Holland Centennial Commons Building, a building to honor both Holland and the school's 2011 centennial. The completed building was dedicated in September 2012.

Holland transferred to BYU, where he graduated with a bachelor's degree in English. He wrote a thesis on selected changes to the text of the Book of Mormon to complete his master's degree in religious education from BYU, while also teaching religion classes part-time. After earning his master's degree, Holland became an Institute of Religion teacher in Hayward, California. He worked as an institute director in Seattle, Washington. Holland attended Yale University and earned a second master's degree in American studies, and later a PhD in the same subject. At Yale, Holland studied with American literary scholar and critic R. W. B. Lewis and authored a dissertation on the religious sense of Mark Twain. He was an instructor at the LDS Church's institute in Hartford while he was a student at Yale.

While studying at Yale, Holland served as a counselor in the presidency of the LDS Church's Hartford Connecticut Stake.

Leadership at BYU and CES
Holland served as an institute director in Salt Lake City after earning his PhD He also served as director of the Melchizedek Priesthood MIA and as chair of the Young Adult Committee for the LDS Church. In 1974, at the age of thirty-three, Holland was appointed Dean of Religious Education at BYU. While dean, Holland founded BYU’s Religious Studies Center and became its first director. From 1976 to 1980, he served as the eleventh commissioner of CES, replacing Neal A. Maxwell, who was called to the First Council of the Seventy. During this time, Holland also served on the board of directors of LDS Hospital and of the Polynesian Cultural Center.

In 1980, Holland was appointed to succeed Dallin H. Oaks as president of BYU. After a search committee was formed, as a favorite candidate of the First Counselor in the LDS Church's First Presidency, N. Eldon Tanner, and the protege of the chair of the executive committee of the BYU Board of Trustees, Gordon B. Hinckley, Holland was appointed less than two days later. As the church's Commissioner of Education at the time Oaks was released, Holland was supposed to compile a list of candidates to be the next BYU president. Instead, he was unexpectedly notified of the First Presidency's intention to make him president. After his appointment, rumors on campus cited the decision as "politically motivated". Before he arrived in Provo, Holland reduced the number of vice-presidents to four and increased the number of assistant and associate vice-presidents over academics.

Holland easily transitioned into the role of president. He was familiar with the president's duties, since he had worked closely with Oaks as the Commissioner of Education. He placed emphasis on upgrading programs and improving relationships with faculty rather than focusing on physical expansion of the campus. In order to supplement the school's funds, Holland launched a fundraiser called "Excellence in the Eighties" which sought to raise $100 million from 1982 to 1987. Specific funds were raised for student scholarships, academic programs, faculty salaries, and extension programs. He emphasized hiring more qualified faculty and purchasing more library and research materials. He supervised the building of the Crabtree Technology Building, but didn't promise more than ten new buildings during his presidency.

A significant achievement during Holland's presidency was the founding of the BYU Jerusalem Center. Also during his presidency, the BYU Center for International Studies was renamed the David M. Kennedy Center for International Studies and had its role at BYU re-emphasized. There had been a large amount of debate about BYU's dress code throughout the previous administration. Holland clarified his support for dress code rules. Regarding violations of the Honor Code, if a student requested their names be removed from the church records, Holland instituted a policy in which they would have to receive special permission from the Board of Trustees in order to remain enrolled in school.

During Holland's presidency, the weekly independent student newspaper, The 7th East Press was shut down due to writing about controversial topics. However, student editor Dean Huffaker believed that Holland had tried to prevent them from being banned because Holland was conscious of public relations and didn't want to cause controversy. The students stated that they believed the ban came from one of the LDS Church's general authorities.

Holland had the re-establishment of religious instruction as the "hub" of BYU's academics as one of his significant administrative goals. While he did not initiate any significant changes along these lines he did in his public communications regularly emphasize the importance of religious education. As president of BYU, Holland encouraged academic excellence in an atmosphere of faith. Holland emphasized that BYU could not do everything, but would seek excellence in what it did choose to do.

Holland served as the president of the American Association of Presidents of Independent Colleges and Universities (AAPICU) and as a member of the NCAA's presidents' committee. He also received the "Torch of Liberty" award from the Anti-Defamation League.

LDS Church service
Holland was called as a general authority and member of the First Quorum of the Seventy on April 1, 1989, bringing an end to his term as president of BYU. As a member of the Seventy, Holland was a counselor in the general presidency of the church's Young Men organization from 1989 to 1990.

Prior to his call as a general authority, Holland served as bishop of a single adult ward in Seattle, as a counselor in the presidency of the Hartford Connecticut Stake, and as a regional representative. He also served in the presidency of two other stakes and as a stake high councilor.

From 1990 to 1993, Holland and his wife lived in Solihull, England where he served as president of the church's Europe North Area.

On June 23, 1994, Holland was selected and ordained as an apostle by new church president Howard W. Hunter.  The vacancy was created by the death of Ezra Taft Benson and subsequent reorganization of the First Presidency. This timing differed from the typical sustaining of new apostles in a general conference and ordaining them afterward.  Holland also met with the media on the day of his ordination. His call to the apostleship was subsequently ratified by the church during the October 1994 General Conference.

In 2000, Holland became the chair of the Missionary Curriculum Task Force which worked to develop Preach My Gospel.

Holland lived in Santiago and served as president of the church's Chile Area from 2002 to 2004.

In church general conferences in the fall of 2007 and spring of 2008, Holland gave sermons that directly answered accusations that Latter-day Saints are not Christians. At the April 2009 general conference, Holland gave a sermon about the crucifixion of Jesus Christ and the importance of Christ's statement, "my God, my God, why hast thou forsaken me". This talk was later reformatted with music and put on a church website where it had been viewed over 500,000 times by August 2009.

In 2012, Holland was the member of the Quorum of the Twelve with responsibility for the affairs of the LDS Church in Africa. Early in that year, he went to Sierra Leone, Liberia, and Ghana to meet with members and missionaries. He also met with the Vice President of Sierra Leone, Samuel Sam-Sumana. In December 2012, Holland organized the 3,000th stake of the LDS Church, which was located in Freetown, Sierra Leone. On March 12, 2012, the Harvard Law School hosted Holland for a Mormonism 101 series. On June 10, 2015, he addressed the All-Party Parliamentary Group on Foreign Affairs in the House of Lords at the UK Parliament. In 2016, Holland was keynote speaker at the Boy Scouts of America's (BSA) Duty to God breakfast, as part of his assignment as The Church of Jesus Christ of Latter-day Saints' chief representative to the BSA.

Since January 2018, among his other assignments, Holland has served on the Church Board of Education and Boards of Trustees, where he also serves as chairman of the Executive Committee.

In November 2018, Holland spoke at a major inter-religious conference at Oxford University. During the same trip, Holland met with Theresa May, Prime Minister of Great Britain.  This may have been the first official meeting of an LDS Church apostle and a British Prime Minister.

In January 2019, Holland presided at the groundbreaking for the church's Urdaneta Philippines Temple. He also spoke at a multi-stake conference in the Philippines that week. In 2020, as chairman of the executive committee of the BYU-Hawaii board of trustees, he announced the appointment of John S. K. Kauwe III as the institution's new president.

In August 2021, Holland spoke at BYU's annual conference for faculty and staff and the speech sparked controversy within the LGBTQ+ community. In the address, Holland asked the faculty to defend the doctrine of the LDS Church, BYU's institutional sponsor with the use of metaphorical "musket fire."

Family
Holland and his wife, Patricia Terry, were married on June 7, 1963, in the St. George Temple.  They are the parents of three children. Their oldest son, Matthew S. Holland, served as president of Utah Valley University from 2009 to 2018 and has been a general authority since April 2020.
Their youngest son, David F. Holland, is a professor at Harvard Divinity School.

Works
Books

 
 
 
 
 
 
 
 
 
 
 
 
 

Speeches

 
 
 
 
  — unofficial transcript

Awards
 Eagle Scout Award by the Boy Scouts of America (1955)
 Distinguished Eagle Scout Award by the National Eagle Scout Association
 Torch of Liberty Award by the Anti-Defamation League of B'nai B'rith
 Washington County Exemplary Manhood Award (July 2013)

See also
 Council on the Disposition of the Tithes

References

Further reading

External links

 General Authorities and General Officers: Elder Jeffrey R. Holland
 Holland on Special Witnesses of Christ

1940 births
20th-century Mormon missionaries
American Latter Day Saint writers
American Mormon missionaries in England
Apostles (LDS Church)
Brigham Young University alumni
Church Educational System instructors
Commissioners of Church Education (LDS Church)
Counselors in the General Presidency of the Young Men (organization)
Utah Tech University alumni
Living people
Mormon apologists
People from St. George, Utah
Presidents of Brigham Young University
Regional representatives of the Twelve
Yale University alumni
American general authorities (LDS Church)
Latter Day Saints from Utah
Latter Day Saints from California
Latter Day Saints from Connecticut
American expatriates in Chile
Harold B. Lee Library-related University Archives articles